A diorama is a 19th-century theatrical device or modern three-dimensional model.

Diorama can also refer to:

Diorama (Silverchair album), 2002
Diorama (Kenshi Yonezu album), 2012
Diorama (band), a German electropop band
Diorama, Goiás, a town in Goiás state, Brazil
Diorama (Efteling), an attraction in Efteling amusement park in the Netherlands
Diorama effect, miniature faking of a photograph

See also
Dierama